This page summarises the Main Path matches of the 2020–21 UEFA Europa League qualifying phase and play-off round.

Times are CEST (UTC+2), as listed by UEFA (local times, if different, are in parentheses).

Preliminary round

Summary

|}

Matches

First qualifying round

Summary

|}

Matches

Second qualifying round

Summary

|+Main Path

|}

Notes

Matches

Third qualifying round

Summary

|+Main Path

|}

Matches

Play-off round

Summary

|+Main Path

|}

Matches

Notes

References

External links

Fixtures and Results, 2020–21, UEFA.com

1M
UEFA Europa League qualifying rounds